Wesley Eric Weston Jr. (born March 3, 1981), better known by his stage name Lil' Flip, is an American rapper. He embarked on his musical career as a freestyle and battle rapper before earning a record deal with Suckafree Records in 1999. Lil' Flip is best known for his singles "The Way We Ball", "Game Over" and "Sunshine".

Musical career

1999–2003: The Leprechaun and Undaground Legend 
In 1999 Lil' Flip would sign his first record deal with independent Houston, Texas label Sucka Free. On July 18, 2000, Lil' Flip released his debut album The Leprechaun, catching the attention of DJ Screw, who added Flip into his  rap group the Screwed Up Click. DJ Screw proclaimed Lil' Flip "The Freestyle King."

In 2002, Columbia Records offered Flip a contract and Sucka Free a distribution deal. Flip stated "We felt that they not only respected what we'd already accomplished on our own, but they also saw the big picture of what me as an artist, and Hump and I as Sucka Free's CEOs were all about." Lil Flip released his second album Undaground Legend on August 27, 2002. The album was certified Platinum in December 2002. It contained his hit single "The Way We Ball". In 2003 Lil' Flip was also featured in David Banner single "Like A Pimp". Then he also made featured appearance on Yung Wun's charting single "Tear It Up". He also made another appearance on Three 6 Mafia single "Ridin' Spinners" that made the charts. In 2003, he also did a track with Ludacris called "Screwed Up".

2004–05: U Gotta Feel Me 
In 2004 Lil' Flip released his third album & first double-disc album U Gotta Feel Me, his most successful album to date. Lil' Flip's label Columbia restructured and Flip ended up at Sony Urban Music, which he believed could promote his work better. The first single from the album was "Game Over (Flip)". After that he quickly released his second single, "Sunshine" featuring Lea Sunshine. This album sold 200,000 copies in its first week and was certified Platinum by August 2004. Lil' Flip also made an appearance on the "Naughty Girl (Remix)" with Beyoncé in 2004. He was also featured on Chingy's Powerballin' on the remix of Chingy's successful hit single "Balla Baby". In 2004 he also made a remix to his hit single "Game Over (Flip)" which featured Young Buck and Bun B. He also made a guest appearance on Nelly's successful 2004 album "Sweat". He also collaborated with Jim Jones and The Game on the "Certified Gangstas (Remix)" in 2004. In 2005 Lil' Flip & Z-Ro made a collaboration album titled Kings of the South. Also in 2005 Lil' Flip was featured in Chamillionaire's first single "Turn It Up". He was also featured in the remix of Bun B's single "Draped Up". Lil' Flip was also featured on the " 2 Fast 2 Furious" soundtrack with the track Rollin' on 20s featuring fellow Houston rapper "Yung Redd".

2007–09: I Need Mine and Respect Me 
In 2007 Lil' Flip left Columbia records, founding his own label Clover G Records & would sign a new label deal with Asylum & Warner Bros. Lil' Flip would release his third album & second double-disc album titled I Need Mine on March 27, 2007, the album debuted at number 15 on the Billboard 200 with 43,000 copies sold in its first week. Only two singles were released from the album, "What It Do" & "Ghetto Mindstate (Can't Get Away)".

His planned fifth album Ahead of My Time was originally set to be released as early as 2007, but was pushed back many times. Lil' Flip released two "album-before-the-album's" in 2009 to help promote the release of Ahead of My Time. On September 29, 2009, Lil' Flip would release his fifth album titled Respect Me to promote Ahead of My Time, it would be distributed by High Powered Entertainment & E1 Music. On December 24, 2009, Lil' Flip would release his first independent album titled Underground Legend 2 to promote Ahead of My Time, it would be distributed independently by Lil' Flip's self-owned label Clover G Records.

2010–present: More independent releases 
On July 6, 2010, Lil' Flip would release Ahead of My Time as his second independent album, and debuted his artist Damienn jones "Beauty and the Beast" album, it would be distributed independently by Lil' Flip's self-owned label Clover G Records.

On October 31, 2013, Lil' Flip released his third independent album The Black Dr. Kevorkian, it would also be distributed independently by Lil' Flip's self-owned label Clover G Records & would sell over 10,000 copies its first week.

On March 17, 2015, Lil' Flip released his sixth album titled El Jefe, it was distributed by SoSouth Records. The lead single from the album was titled "Game Over II", which was sequel to his single "Game Over (Flip)". The second single from the album, was titled "In My Pimp C Voice", which was a dedication song towards deceased artist Pimp C. The third single from the album, was titled "Bestfriend" the single would feature artist's E.J. Carter & Rev City.

Other ventures

Clover G Records 

Clover G Records or Clover G La Familia is a record label owned by Houston, Texas rapper Lil' Flip, it was created in 2004.

Fashion designing 
In 2004 Lil' Flip released his shoe line titled "Clover Footwear" which is branded off his self-owned label Clover G Records. Lil' Flip also has a fashion clothing line titled "Clover G Clothing" which is also branded off his self-owned label Clover G Records.

Author 
On April 15, 2014, Lil' Flip released his first book titled Don't Let the Music Industry Fool You!, the book was released with a soundtrack album.

Discography

Studio albums 
 2000: The Leprechaun
 2002: Undaground Legend
 2004: U Gotta Feel Me
 2007: I Need Mine
 2009: Respect Me
 2009: Underground Legend 2
 2010: Ahead of My Time
 2013: The Black Dr. Kevorkian
 2015: El Jefe
 2016: The Art of Freestyle
 2018: King
 2018: Life
 2019: The Art of Freestyle 2
 2019: The Music Machine
 2020: Feelings
 2020: No Feelings
 2020: The Leprechaun 2
 2022: The Art of Freestyle 3
 2022: Fondren Flip

Collaboration albums 
 2005: Kings of the South (with Z-Ro)
 2006: Connected (with Mr. Capone-E)
 2007: Still Connected (with Mr. Capone-E)
 2008: All Eyez on Us (with Young Noble)
 2009: Certified (with Gudda Gudda)
 TBA: Kings of the South II (with Z-Ro)

Soundtrack album 
 2014: Don't Let the Music Industry Fool You

Bibliography 
 Don't Let The Music Industry Fool You! by Wesley "Lil' Flip" Weston (2014: Harris Royal Bloodline Publishing, April 15, 2014)

References

External links 
 Official website

1981 births
Living people
African-American male rappers
African-American non-fiction writers
American non-fiction writers
American shooting survivors
Rappers from Houston
Screwed Up Click members
Songwriters from Texas
Southern hip hop musicians
Warner Records artists
Writers from Houston
Gangsta rappers
African-American record producers
American music industry executives
American hip hop record producers
African-American songwriters
21st-century American rappers
Record producers from Texas
21st-century American male musicians
21st-century African-American musicians
20th-century African-American people
American male songwriters